is a former spokesperson and public relations manager of the Japanese doomsday cult Aum Shinrikyo, and served as the de facto chief of the organization from 1999 to 2007, when he split and formed a new group.

Background

Fumihiro Joyu, originally from Kurume, Fukuoka in Kyūshū, graduated from Waseda University, one of Japan's most prestigious private colleges, with an M.A. degree in artificial intelligence.

Spokesperson for Aum Shinrikyo

Summoned to Japan after the arrests of senior followers following the 1995 sarin gas attack on the Tokyo subway, he resumed his position as Aum Shinrikyo's spokesperson. He was arrested and tried for "inciting others to make false statements during [1992] court hearings". Some observers linked Joyu's indictment to a supposed government attempt to "decapitate the cult".  The arrest, lengthy trial, and subsequent acquittal of Japan's veteran attorney and Human Rights activist Yoshihiro Yasuda, then head of Shoko Asahara's legal team, a move which was harshly criticized by Human Rights Watch, is often cited in support of this hypothesis.

Joyu would often argue with reporters during press conferences.  Especially after the sarin attack, he was sometimes referred to by Japanese as "Aa ieba Joyu", which is a pun on the expression "Aaieba koiu", meaning someone who is excessively contrarian and argumentative (literally "you say one thing and he says the opposite").

He was sentenced to three years in prison and was released in 1999. Later, Joyu apologized for denying Aum's responsibility for the subway attack, saying at that time he had believed that in defending Aum he did the right thing.

Aleph (1999–2006)

On his release on 29 December 1999, Joyu became the de facto head of the organisation. Under his leadership, Aum Shinrikyo has changed its name to Aleph, the first letter of the Carthaginian alphabet. The group has admitted responsibility for the various incidents involving some of its former senior members, including the Tokyo Subway gas attack, delivered apologies to the victims, and established a special compensations fund. Some of the controversial doctrines that previously attracted criticisms were removed. Most of the time, Joyu resided within Aum's religious facilities with occasional trips to the outside world. Police officials were quoted as advising him to refrain from public activities as they 'could not guarantee his safety'.

Joyu's attempts to soften tensions with society did not win him much praise, though. Judging from the statements made by the country's government officials and unanimously critical media coverage, Aleph is still regarded as a threat.

The Circle of Rainbow Light (2007–present)

Leadership split into two opposing factions by the end of 2005, according to the Japanese media quoting the Public Security Intelligence Agency (PSIA), which has been monitoring Aleph since 1999. While the fundamentalist faction wishes to keep the organization as close to its pre-1995 ideal, Joyu and his reformer supporters advocate a milder course, aimed at softening social tensions and re-integration into society.

Opposing factions split in late summer 2006, with Joyu and his supporters (among them many former Aum leaders) residing in a separate building in Tokyo and calling themselves Hikari no Wa (The Circle of Rainbow Light). According to Joyu, many of the members have not taken sides yet, and keep staying with the opposing group. It was raided by PSIA agents on 10 May 2007.

References

External links
"Air raids that victimize innocent people can only lead to the next terrorism and prolonged warfare." Fumihiro Joyu's views on the terrorist attacks of September 11th, the War on Terror and terrorism in general (in English). Excerpted and summarized from his private homepage.
Japan Times: "You Just Have to Ask"   – Reports on two documentary films by Tatsuya Mori, that received awards at the Berlin Documentary Film Festival, shown in Japan only theatrically. The films feature hours of footage, shot inside the AUM facilities, including Fumihiro Joyu's everyday activities;
Midnight Eye: A. A review of Tatsuya Mori's first documentary film on Aleph immediately precedent to Joyu's work as its then head of Aleph and shortly after he accepted the post of its leader;
[www.tokyoweekender.com/2015/03/20-years-after-the-aum-shinrikyo-attacks-a-former-leader-speaks-out/] Interview with Joyu: on his period with Aum Shinrikyo and then Aleph, reasons for joining, opinions during and after the 1995 Sarin Gas Attack incident and his own new group Hikari no Wa.

1962 births
Living people
Aum Shinrikyo
Japanese religious leaders
People from Kurume
Waseda University alumni
Japanese expatriates in Russia